Two ships of the United States Navy have been assigned the name USS Sagacity.

Construction, however, was canceled on 6 June 1944, prior to completion.
She was launched in 1954, reclassified as an ocean minesweeper, MSO-469, in 1955, and struck in 1970.

References

United States Navy ship names